Mike Hallett is an American football coach.  He currently serves as the co-offensive coordinator and offensive line coach at the University of Toledo. Hallet served as the head coach at Thomas More College in Crestview Hills, Kentucky from 2004 to 2006 and at Heidelberg College from 2007 to 2015.

Head coaching record

References

External links
 Toledo profile

1968 births
Living people
American football defensive linemen
Heidelberg Student Princes football coaches
Mount Union Purple Raiders football players
Thomas More Saints football coaches
Toledo Rockets football coaches
Wooster Fighting Scots football coaches
High school football coaches in Ohio